The Dushantsi reservoir (Bulgarian: Душанци язовир) is settled in the Balkan Mountains, Bulgaria.

The dam wall can be easily reached by car, driving along the old road to Burgas. The area around the reservoir is used for outgoings, picnics, water sports and fishing.

The Topolnitsa River feeds the reservoir, and is another suitable place for fishing.

Reservoirs in Bulgaria